Barbugeh (also Romanized as Barbūgeh; also known as Barbūqeh and Berbāgeh) is a village in Mosharrahat Rural District, in the Central District of Ahvaz County, Khuzestan Province, Iran. At the 2006 census, its population was 167, in 28 families.

References 

Populated places in Ahvaz County